Floyd "Butch" Martin (born June 26, 1929) is a retired Canadian ice hockey player who competed in the 1956 Winter Olympics and 1960 Winter Olympics.

Martin was a member of the Kitchener-Waterloo Dutchmen who won the bronze medal for Canada in ice hockey at the 1956 Winter Olympics and the silver medal for Canada in ice hockey at the 1960 Winter Olympics. He played for the Johnstown Jets and Pittsburgh Hornets. Martin played 205 matches in the Eastern Hockey League and 2 matches in the American Hockey League.

References

External links

 Floyd Martin's profile at Sports Reference.com

1929 births
Living people
Canadian ice hockey right wingers
Johnstown Jets players
Pittsburgh Hornets players
Windsor Bulldogs (1963–1964) players
Olympic ice hockey players of Canada
Ice hockey players at the 1956 Winter Olympics
Ice hockey players at the 1960 Winter Olympics
Olympic silver medalists for Canada
Olympic bronze medalists for Canada
Olympic medalists in ice hockey
Medalists at the 1956 Winter Olympics
Medalists at the 1960 Winter Olympics